General Hodge may refer to:

Sir Edward Hodge (1810–1894), British Army general
George Baird Hodge (1828–1892), Confederate States Army acting brigadier general
James L. Hodge (born c. 1954), U.S. Army major general
John R. Hodge (1893–1963), U.S. Army general

See also
General Hodges (disambiguation)